Edward A. Sager (October 17, 1872 – February 7, 1943) was a justice of the Iowa Supreme Court from January 1, 1937, to December 31, 1942, appointed from Bremer County, Iowa.

References

External links

20th-century American judges
Justices of the Iowa Supreme Court
1872 births
1943 deaths